Walthamstow Power Station was a power station operating in London until 1967.

History
The station was authorised in 1904 to supply electricity to the Municipal Borough of Walthamstow. The power station in Exeter Street had three brick chimneys and an array of wooden cooling towers.

In 1923 the revenue to the Borough from sales of electricity was £109,909. Upon nationalisation of the electricity industry in 1948 ownership of the station passed to the British Electricity Authority and later to the Central Electricity Generating Board. The CEGB closed the station in 1967 when the thermal efficiency was 9.30 per cent. It was subsequently demolished, apart from a small number of buildings which are retained as Exeter Street substation and Walthamstow tee point, operated by UK Power Networks.

Electricity capacity and generation
The generating capacity of Walthamstow power station and the electricity generated over the operational life was as follows.

References

Former power stations in London